An activist shareholder is a shareholder who uses an equity stake in a corporation to put pressure on its management. A fairly small stake (less than 10% of outstanding shares) may be enough to launch a successful campaign. In comparison, a full takeover bid is a much more costly and difficult undertaking. The goals of activist shareholders range from financial (increase of shareholder value through changes in corporate policy, cost cutting, etc.) to non-financial (disinvestment from particular countries, etc.). Shareholder activists can address self-dealing by corporate insiders, although large stockholders can also engage in self-dealing to themselves at the expense of smaller minority shareholders.

According to research firm Insightia, a total of 967 listed companies globally were publicly subjected to activist demands in 2022, up from 913 in 2021. Shareholder activism can take any of several forms: proxy battles, publicity campaigns, shareholder resolutions, litigation, and negotiations with management. Daniel Loeb, head of Third Point Management, is notable for his use of sharply written letters directed towards the CEOs of his target companies.

Activism may help to address the principal-agent problem where the management (agents) do not adequately respond to the wishes of the principals (investors) of publicly traded companies. In the 2010s, investments in the activist asset class grew, with activists receiving coverage by the media and positive attention from investors. Activists have typically engaged in adversarial campaigns, but have also in some cases been able to acquire board seats with a formal proxy context.

Shareholder activists are making their mark on mergers and acquisitions as well – a 2015 survey of corporate development leaders found that 60% of respondents saw shareholder activism affecting transaction activity in their industry. Increasingly, however, the non-financial form of shareholder activism is affecting companies in a range of sectors. Shareholders, often with a comparatively small stake in a company, are seeking to influence the company's environmental and social performance.

Some of the recent activist investment funds include: California Public Employees' Retirement System (CalPERS), Icahn Management LP, Santa Monica Partners Opportunity Fund LP, State Board of Administration of Florida (SBA), and Relational Investors, LLC.

Due to the Internet, smaller shareholders have also gained an outlet to voice their opinions. In 2005, small MCI Inc. shareholders created an online petition to protest the MCI/Verizon merger.

History 
Corporations in 18th-century Europe were privileged and relatively uncommon, but in the United States became much more common, starting with 300 in the 1790s and expanding by around 26,000 between 1790 and the 1860s, resulting in about 15 times the corporations in Great Britain by 1830. These early corporations contained various provisions for corporate governance, including restricted charters, bylaws, prudent-mean voting rules, dividend payments, and press coverage.

From 1900 to 1950, about 1.22 "offensive" activist initiatives occurred per year, with more occurring in the 1940s and 1950s. Notable investors included Cyrus S. Eaton, Phoenix Securities Corporation, Benjamin Graham, J. Paul Getty, and Malcolm Chace. Activism was likely limited by the lack of ownership dispersion, meaning that many corporations had large shareholders with sizable blocks (10 to 20% of total shares) who already exerted significant control over the corporation.

Notable investors 
Notable activist investors include: Isaac Le Maire (1558–1624), Carl Icahn, Nelson Peltz (Trian), Bill Ackman (Pershing Square), Daniel Loeb (Third Point), Barry Rosenstein, Larry Robbins (Glenview), David Einhorn, Gregg Hymowitz (EnTrust Global), Christer Gardell (Cevian Capital), and Ryan Cohen.

During the 1980s, activist investors such as Carl Icahn and T. Boone Pickens gained international notoriety and were often perceived as "corporate raiders" for acquiring an equity stake in publicly owned companies, like Icahn's investment in B.F. Goodrich, and then forcing companies to take action to improve value or rid themselves of rebel intruders like Icahn by buying back the raider's investment at a fat premium, often at the expense of the other shareholders.  More recently, activist investor Phillip Goldstein suggested that the role of the activist investor has moved from green mail to one of being a catalyst to unlock value in an underlying security, and says that the public perception of activist investors as "corporate raiders" has dissipated.

In 2019, notable activist investors included Starboard Value, Ancora, Icahn, Elliot Management, and Third Point (Loeb). In 2019, mutual funds such as Wellington Management Company had begun to show signs of activism.

Outreach strategies 
Activist investors advertise their message out in various ways including postal mail, websites, and social media.

Statistics 
As of 2018, there had been an average of 272 activist campaigns per year in the United States, including 47 proxy contests. About 47% of targeted companies were outside of the United States.

Proxy advisory 
As of 2020, passive investors such as index funds by Vanguard as well as non-activist but still active management investors such as mutual funds play a significant role in corporate governance. These firms use proxy advisory firms such as Institutional Shareholder Services to receive recommendations on how to vote on shareholder proposals.

Funding 
Activist investors are often hedge funds funded by accredited investors and institutions. In 2019, institutions were demanding more upfront explanation of the activist ideas before funding, and in some cases requiring that the funds be placed into special purpose vehicles specifically for the project. Activist hedge funds, which are hedge funds that "take concentrated positions in the equity of public corporations and actively engage with corporate managers" can address the principal-agent problem and limit self-dealing by providing management with high-powered incentives to increase value.

Offensive versus defensive 
Shareholder activism can be categorized as "offensive" or "defensive"; in the latter case, an existing shareholder attempts to correct some deficiency, while offensive activists build a position with the intention to agitate for change. Shareholders can also initiative a derivative suit to force action by the corporation. Shareholders can also engage in a securities class action but these are typically not associated with activism.

Laws 
In the United States, acquisition of over 5% of beneficial ownership in a company with the intention to influence leadership must be accompanied by a Schedule 13D filing; investors who do not intend to become activists may file a Schedule 13G instead.

Proxy access 

Historically, investors were required to mail separate ballots when trying to nominate someone of their own to the board, but beginning in 2015, proxy access rules began to spread driven by initiatives from major institutional investors, and as of 2018, 71% of S&P 500 companies had a proxy access rule.

Voting 
Votes for the board may be "straight" or "cumulative"; in cumulative voting, a shareholder can put all of their votes toward a single candidate, which makes it easier for minority shareholders to elect candidates. There has also been a movement toward "majority" voting, where a candidate must receive the majority of votes. Most large corporations are incorporated in Delaware due to the well-developed Delaware General Corporation Law; in Delaware, cumulative voting is optional, but exceptions exist; for example, a California-based but Delaware-registered corporation may be "pseudo-foreign" under California law and therefore have to comply with California law.

Performance 

Taking an activist approach to public investing may produce returns in excess of those likely to be achieved passively. A 2012 study by Activist Insight showed that the mean annual net return of over 40 activist-focused hedge funds had consistently outperformed the MSCI world index in the years following the global financial crisis in 2008. Activist investing was the top-performing strategy among hedge funds in 2013, with such firms returning, on average, 16.6% while other hedge funds returned 9.5%.

Research 
Shareholder activism directed at both European and American companies has been surging. A 1996 study found that larger firms with higher institutional holdings made firms more likely to be targeted by activist investors. Researchers also try to understand what makes company a desirable target for an activist investor. Lately, both scholars and practitioners started using machine learning methodologies to predict both targets and activists.

Retail involvement 
Any shareholder, including a non-institutional retail investors, may submit a shareholder proposal in the United States, and between 1934 and the mid-1980s these shareholders typically submitted proposals. One estimate placed institutional owners at 68% of shares and retail at 32% of shares, but 98% of institutional owners vote and only 28% of retail owners vote. Institutional shareholders, however, often vote automatically upon the advice of proxy advisory firms; allowing retail shareholders to vote based upon a guideline ("standing voting instructions") has been proposed to increase their involvement.

Various websites have been created to facilitate retail involvement, including Moxy Vote, Shareowners.org, United States Proxy Exchange and ProxyDemocracy.org, but over time these generally shut down.

Political and labor involvement 
Labor unions, including through pension funds such as CalPERS coalitions such as the Change to Win Federation often engage in shareholder proposals. The Shareholder Rights Group is a coalition of shareholder proposal advocates.

Socially responsible investing 
Organizations such as the Interfaith Center on Corporate Responsibility (ICCR), As You Sow and Ceres use shareholder resolutions, and other means of pressure, to address issues such as sustainability and human rights.

For an analysis of the hundreds of annual shareholder resolutions, see Proxy Preview.

See also 
 Board of directors
 Corporate governance
 Corporate raid

 Corporate social responsibility

 Proxy statement

 Shareholder rebellion
 Socially responsible investing

References

Further reading
Icahn calls for Time Warner breakup, buyback / CNNMoney.com
 Third Point Management's letter to Star Gas CEO, Irik Sevin
Qwest Withdraws from Bidding – Denver Business Journal / MCIpetition.com 
Academic Literature Summary (archived 27 December 2013)
The Rise of Activist Investing and How to Respond
A&M Activist Alert
Predicting Shareholder Activist Targets, Nordantech.com

Corporate governance
Activism by type
Shareholders